Asphalt Ballet is an American rock band formed in San Diego, California. Their style is rooted in blues rock and incorporates elements of hard rock and Southern rock.

The band's name was derived from descriptive terminology used to depict a motorcyclist, crashing and skidding along an asphalt concrete road at high speed. The band consists of vocalist Gary Jeffries, bassist Terry Phillips, drummer Mikki Kiner, and guitarists Danny Clarke and Julius J. Ulrich, although by 2019 the status of the band is unknown. Jeffries fronts the Gary Jeffries Band. When was asked about a reunion with his former bandmates and said, "I wouldn't be opposed to it, but man, I haven't talked to them guys in about 20 years, their MySpace is no longer available."

History 
Virgin Records signed the band and released their self-titled debut album in 1991.<ref name="LarkinHM" Jeffries left due to pressure from the label to change their style to sound more like grunge. Their second album, Pigs, was released in 1993, with Tommy Dean on lead vocals. The band split up shortly after the release of Pigs.

Information about recording new material may be on the band's MySpace web page, but the most recent was reportedly in February 2011.

Membership 
Gary Jeffries – vocals. harmonica
Terry Phillips – bass
Julius Ulrich – guitar
Danny Clarke – guitar
Mikki Kiner – drums
Tommy Dean – vocals

Discography

Studio albums

EPs

Singles

References 

American blues rock musical groups
Hard rock musical groups from California
Virgin Records artists